WAPP-LP (100.3 FM) is a low-power FM radio station licensed to Westhampton, New York.

See also 
 LifeTalk Radio — former network affiliation

References

External links 
 

APP-LP
Mass media in Suffolk County, New York
APP-LP